Hyporhagus is a genus of opossum beetles in the family Zopheridae. There are about 6 described species in Hyporhagus.

Species
 Hyporhagus gilensis Horn, 1872
 Hyporhagus leechi Freude, 1955
 Hyporhagus opaculus LeConte, 1866
 Hyporhagus pseudogilensis Freude, 1955
 Hyporhagus punctulatus Thomson, 1860
 Hyporhagus valdepunctatus Thomson, 1860

References

Further reading

 
 
 

Zopheridae